Ventura–East station (formerly Montalvo) is a Metrolink passenger train station in the Montalvo neighborhood of Ventura, California. Passengers board here for Metrolink's Ventura County Line going towards Los Angeles Union Station. The platform is just off the main coast route on the Santa Paula Branch Line which is owned by the Ventura County Transportation Commission.

The station opened for regular service on November 11, 2002; a grand opening ceremony took place on November 8. Prior to that, Metrolink trains that ran from Los Angeles to Oxnard were stored overnight at this site with no passenger boardings.

Amtrak's Pacific Surfliner remains on the Coast line towards downtown Ventura and Santa Barbara, and does not switch over to serve this station. Growth in commuters traveling towards Los Angeles is expected to favor this location over the (downtown) Ventura station used by the Pacific Surfliner. Overnight storage of trains in downtown would also be expensive if that station was used.

On May 9, 2011, Metrolink renamed the station from Montalvo to Ventura–East due to the lack of name recognition. Montalvo had been the name of the junction at this location for over a hundred years and subsequently the community, later annexed by the city of Ventura, that grew adjacent to the junction.

References

External links 

Metrolink stations in Ventura County, California
Buildings and structures in Ventura, California
Railway stations in the United States opened in 2002
2002 establishments in California